Clary's Cafe is a restaurant in Savannah, Georgia, United States. Established at 404 Abercorn Street in 1903, originally as a drug store, its popularity increased markedly after its appearance in both John Berendt's Midnight in the Garden of Good and Evil 1994 novel and Clint Eastwood's 1997 movie adaptation.

Midnight in the Garden of Good and Evil

The author of Midnight in the Garden of Good and Evil, John Berendt, described Clary's as "a clearinghouse of information, a bourse of gossip," where he came to know the characters who would animate his narrative. James Gandolfini made an uncredited appearance as the cook in the two scenes filmed at the cafe.

A photograph of the cast hangs inside the restaurant, featuring Alison Eastwood (who plays Mandy), her father, Clint Eastwood (director), The Lady Chablis, John Cusack (John Kelso), Kevin Spacey (Jim Williams) and Jack Thompson (Sonny Seiler).

References

External links

"PrimeEats #6 - Clary's Cafe - Savannah, Georgia" – PrimeTime Travelers, YouTube, January 13, 2021

Restaurants in Savannah, Georgia
Restaurants established in 1903
1903 establishments in Georgia (U.S. state)
Lunch counters